Bardel Entertainment, Inc. is a Canadian animation studio founded in Vancouver, British Columbia, in 1987. The studio's name comes from its founders, Barry Ward and his wife Delna Bhesania.

Bardel is involved in the acquisition, development, production and distribution of animated programming. The studio is best known for animating Rick and Morty, Teenage Mutant Ninja Turtles, and The Dragon Prince. On October 5, 2015, Bardel was purchased by Rainbow S.p.A., an Italian studio owned by Iginio Straffi and formerly co-owned by Paramount Global.

In September 2021, Bardel appointed Tina Chow as CEO and Richard Grieve as COO.

Filmography

Television

Film

Other

References

External links 
 Official site
 Bardel Entertainment on IMDb
 Bardel Entertainment on LinkedIn
 Bardel Entertainment on Twitter 
 Bardel Entertainment on Instagram

Canadian animation studios
Companies based in Vancouver
Entertainment companies established in 1987
2015 mergers and acquisitions
Rainbow S.r.l.
Paramount Global subsidiaries
Animation studios owned by Paramount Global